Cass County is a county in the central part of the U.S. state of Minnesota. As of the 2020 census, the population was 30,066. Its county seat is Walker. The county was formed in 1851, and was organized in 1897.

Cass County is included in the Brainerd, MN Micropolitan Statistical Area.

A substantial part of the Leech Lake Indian Reservation is in the county.

History

Cass County was created on September 1, 1851, by the Minnesota Territory legislature, although its government was not organized until 1897. The county was formed of areas partitioned from Dakota, Mahkatah, Pembina and Wahnata Counties. It was named for Lewis Cass, a Michigan political figure of the 19th century. Before it was organized several parcels of county land were partitioned off to augment or form adjacent counties.

Geography
The Crow Wing River flows east-southeast along Cass County's southern border, and the Gull River flows southwest through the lower part, to discharge into the Crow Wing on the southern border. The terrain consists of wooded rolling hills, heavily dotted with lakes and ponds, and slopes to the south and east; its highest point is on the upper western border, at 1,614' (492m) ASL.

Major highways

  US Highway 2
  Minnesota State Highway 6
  Minnesota State Highway 34
  Minnesota State Highway 64
  Minnesota State Highway 84
  Minnesota State Highway 87
  Minnesota State Highway 200
  Minnesota State Highway 210
  Minnesota State Highway 371
List of county roads

Adjacent counties

 Itasca County - northeast
 Aitkin County - east
 Crow Wing County - southeast
 Morrison County - south
 Todd County - southwest
 Wadena County - west
 Hubbard County - northwest
 Beltrami County - north

Protected areas

 Buena Vista State Forest (part)
 Chippewa National Forest (part)
 Crow Wing State Park (part)
 Foot Hills State Forest (part)

Climate and weather

Demographics

2000 census
As of the 2000 census, there were 27,150 people, 10,893 households, and 7,734 families in the county. The population density was 13.4/sqmi (5.18/km2). There were 21,286 housing units at an average density of 10.5/sqmi (4.06/km2). The racial makeup of the county was 86.52% White, 0.11% Black or African American, 11.45% Native American, 0.28% Asian, 0.02% Pacific Islander, 0.14% from other races, and 1.47% from two or more races. 0.81% of the population were Hispanic or Latino of any race. 28.2% were of German, 15.0% Norwegian, 7.3% Swedish, 6.1% Irish and 6.1% American ancestry.

There were 10,893 households, out of which 27.70% had children under the age of 18 living with them, 58.40% were married couples living together, 8.00% had a female householder with no husband present, and 29.00% were non-families. 25.00% of all households were made up of individuals, and 11.90% had someone living alone who was 65 years of age or older. The average household size was 2.45 and the average family size was 2.90.

The county population contained 25.00% under the age of 18, 6.10% from 18 to 24, 23.00% from 25 to 44, 27.90% from 45 to 64, and 18.00% who were 65 years of age or older. The median age was 42 years. For every 100 females there were 101.90 males. For every 100 females age 18 and over, there were 100.60 males.

The median income for a household in the county was $34,332, and the median income for a family was $40,156. Males had a median income of $30,097 versus $21,232 for females. The per capita income for the county was $17,189. About 9.50% of families and 13.60% of the population were below the poverty line, including 18.20% of those under age 18 and 13.30% of those age 65 or over.

2020 Census

Communities

Cities

 Backus
 Bena
 Boy River
 Cass Lake
 Chickamaw Beach
 East Gull Lake
 Federal Dam
 Hackensack
 Lake Shore
 Longville
 Motley (partial)
 Pillager
 Pine River
 Remer
 Walker (county seat)

Census-designated place
 Whipholt

Unincorporated communities

 Ah-gwah-ching
 Brevik
 Bridgeman
 Casino
 Ellis
 Esterdy
 Graff
 Inguadona
 Leader
 Leech Lake
 Mae
 Mildred
 Onigum
 Oshawa
 Outing
 Pontoria
 Raboin
 Ryan Village
 Schley
 Snowball
 Sylvan
 Tobique
 Wabedo
 Wilkinson

Townships

 Ansel Township
 Barclay Township
 Becker Township
 Beulah Township
 Birch Lake Township
 Blind Lake Township
 Boy Lake Township
 Boy River Township
 Bull Moose Township
 Bungo Township
 Byron Township
 Crooked Lake Township
 Deerfield Township
 Fairview Township
 Gould Township
 Hiram Township
 Home Brook Township
 Inguadona Township
 Kego Township
 Leech Lake Township
 Lima Township
 Loon Lake Township
 Maple Township
 May Township
 McKinley Township
 Meadow Brook Township
 Moose Lake Township
 Otter Tail Peninsula Township
 Pike Bay Township
 Pine Lake Township
 Pine River Township
 Ponto Lake Township
 Poplar Township
 Powers Township
 Remer Township
 Rogers Township
 Salem Township
 Shingobee Township
 Slater Township
 Smoky Hollow Township
 Sylvan Township
 Thunder Lake Township
 Torrey Township
 Trelipe Township
 Turtle Lake Township
 Wabedo Township
 Walden Township
 Wilkinson Township
 Wilson Township
 Woodrow Township

Unorganized territories

 Wahnena
 North Cass
 North Central Cass
 East Cass

Government and politics
Cass County tends to vote Republican. As of 2020 the county has selected the Republican nominee in 78% of presidential elections since 1980.

See also
 National Register of Historic Places listings in Cass County, Minnesota
 Woman Lake

References

External links
 Cass County government's website
 Minnesota Department of Transportation map of Cass County (southern portion, west central portion, east central portion, northern portion)

 
Minnesota counties
Leech Lake
1897 establishments in Minnesota
Populated places established in 1897
Minnesota counties on the Mississippi River